Bernardino Bono or Boni (died 1774) was an Italian painter of the late-Baroque period, active in Northern Italy.

He was born in Brescia and putatively a scholar of the Bolognese Giacomo Antonio Boni. It is unclear if they were relatives. He is documented to have painted sacred subjects, including altarpieces and frescoes in the churches of Santi Pietro e Paolo, Pregasso di Marone; the parish church of Cailina; and the Chiesa della Carità, Brescia (1729-1748).

References

Year of birth unknown
1774 deaths
18th-century Italian painters
Italian male painters
Italian Baroque painters
Painters from Brescia
18th-century Italian male artists